Taihe District is a district of the city of Jinzhou, Liaoning, People's Republic of China.

Administrative Divisions
There are six subdistricts and five townships within the district.

Subdistricts:
Taihe Subdistrict, Xinglong Subdistrict, Tanghezi Subdistrict, Lingxi Subdistrict, Lingnan Subdistrict, Xuejia Subdistrict

Townships:
Nü'erhe Township, Daxue Township, Zhongtun Township, Yingpan Township, Xinmin Township

References

External links

County-level divisions of Liaoning
Jinzhou